Oxapampa District is one of eight  districts of Oxapampa Province, one of three provinces in Pasco Department in Peru. The town of Oxapampa is in the district and is the capital of the province. The population of the province was 16,565 in 2017 of which more than 14,000 lived in the town of Oxapampa.

Places of interest
 Yanachaga–Chemillén National Park

References